Kiesselbach's plexus is an anastomotic arterial network (plexus) of four or five arteries in the nose supplying the nasal septum. It lies in the anterior inferior part of the septum known as Little's area, Kiesselbach's area, or Kiesselbach's triangle. It is a common site for nosebleeds.

Structure 
Kiesselbach's plexus is an anastomosis of four or five arteries:

 the anterior ethmoidal artery, a branch of the ophthalmic artery.
 the sphenopalatine artery, a terminal branch of the maxillary artery.
 the greater palatine artery, a branch of the maxillary artery.
 a septal branch of the superior labial artery, a branch of the facial artery.
 a posterior ethmoidal artery, a branch of the ophthalmic artery. There is contention as whether this is truly part of Kiesselbach's plexus. Most sources quote that it is not part of the plexus, but rather one of the blood supplies for the nasal septum itself.

It runs vertically downwards just behind the columella, and crosses the floor of the nose. It joins the venous plexus on the lateral nasal wall.

Function 
Kiesselbach's plexus supplies blood to the nasal septum.

Clinical significance 
Ninety percent of nosebleeds (epistaxis) occur in Kiesselbach's plexus. It is exposed to the drying effect of inhaled air. It can also be damaged by trauma from a finger nail (nose-picking), as it is fragile. It is the usual site for nosebleeds in children and young adults. A physician may use a nasal speculum to see that an anterior nosebleed comes from Kiesselbach's plexus.

History 
James Lawrence Little (1836–1885), an American surgeon, first described the area in detail in 1879. Little described the area as being "about half an inch ... from the lower edge of the middle of the column [septum]".

Kiesselbach's plexus is named after Wilhelm Kiesselbach (1839–1902), a German otolaryngologist who published a paper on the area in 1884. The area may be called Little's area, Kiesselbach's area, or Kiesselbach's triangle.

See also 
 Anatomical terms of location

References

External links 
Epistaxis - utmb.edu
Nose Anatomy - emedicine.com
Nasal Anatomy - fpnotebook.com

Human anatomy
Anatomy named for one who described it